The College of Natural Sciences of the University of Puerto Rico, Río Piedras, was established in 1943. It is one of several colleges that make up the University of Puerto Rico, Rio Piedras campus. Facundo Bueso Sanllehí was its first dean. It is located in the city of San Juan, the capital of Puerto Rico.

In September 2019, the university won a $US17.4 million research grant from 
the National Science Foundation, for wearable technology.

Undergraduate Degrees Offered
Biology
Chemistry (recognized by the American Chemistry Society)
Physics
Environmental Sciences
Interdisciplinary in Natural Science Program
Nutrition
Mathematics
Computer Science

Graduate Degrees Offered
Biology
Chemistry
Physics
Environmental Sciences
Mathematics

Centers
Center for Applied Tropical Ecology and Conservation (CREST-CATEC)
Center for Nanoscale Materials

Facilities
Animal House
Botanical Garden
Center for Educational Production Services
Computing Center
Department of Chemistry Support Facilities
Electronics Workshop
Field House at El Yunque (El Verde)
Greenhouse
Herbarium (http://herbario.uprrp.edu/)
Instrumentation Workshop
Machining Workshop
Natural Sciences Library
Zoology Museum

References

External links
 official website

Universities and colleges in Puerto Rico
University of Puerto Rico, Río Piedras Campus